Mannem Nageswara Rao is a former-interim Director officer Central Bureau of Investigation (CBI) since 11 January 2019 till 1 February 2019. He joined CBI in 2016 and is an Indian Police Service (IPS) officer of 1986 batch and Odisha cadre. He served as Joint Director before being appointed as the Interim Director of CBI for only 22 days.
Rao is from Mangapet village of Warangal district in Telangana State. He is a chemistry post graduate from Osmania University, did his research in Madras IIT, before joining the IPS in 1986.

References

Central Bureau of Investigation
Year of birth missing (living people)
Living people

Indian Hindus
Indian Police Service officers